Mark Anthony McDermott is an Irish rugby union player and coach who now coaches Russia national team.

He played as hooker for Leinster (4 apps in Heineken Cup) and Munster (12 apps in Heineken Cup); and, at the Irish senior level, for Lansdowne FC and Shannon RFC. He also played for Ireland second national team.

McDermott was forwards coach for St. Michael's College, Dublin leading to the school's first Leinster Schools Senior Cup win in 2007. 

He worked with Ireland U21 team as assistant coach, then from May 2004 as coach. He was also IRFU's Elite Player Development Manager.

From August 2016 to February 2018 Mr. McDermott was forwards coach in the Russia national team. In February 2018, after Aleksandr Pervukhin resigned, he was appointed the acting head coach of Russia.

See also 
 2018 Rugby Europe Championship

References 

Irish rugby union players
Leinster Rugby players
Munster Rugby players
Lansdowne Football Club players
Shannon RFC players
Ireland Wolfhounds international rugby union players
Irish rugby union coaches
1971 births
Living people
Rugby union hookers